Charles Burton may refer to:

 Charles Burton (cricketer) (1875–1948), Jamaican cricketer
 Charles Burton (journalist), English journalist and sportswriter
 Charles Burton (judge) (1760–1847), English born barrister and judge in Ireland
 Charles Burton (sinologist), a Canadian political scientist.
 Charles Burton (theologian) (1793–1866), English clergyman and writer
 Charles Burton (wrestler) (born 1973), American Olympic wrestler
 Charles E. Burton (1846–1882), Irish astronomer
 Charles Germman Burton (1846–1926), U.S. Representative from Missouri
 Charles Pierce Burton (1862–1949), newspaper columnist and author
 Charles R. Burton (1942–2002), explorer and member of Transglobe Expedition

 Charles Burton Barber (1845–1894), English painter
 Woody Burton (Charles Burton, born 1945), member of the Indiana House of Representatives

See also
 Charlie Burton (disambiguation)
 Burton baronets, several of whom were named Charles Burton
 Burton (name)